SM UC-65 was a German Type UC II minelaying submarine or U-boat in the German Imperial Navy during World War I. The U-boat was ordered on 12 January 1916 and was launched on 8 July 1916. She was commissioned into the German Imperial Navy on 7 November 1916 as SM UC-65. In eleven patrols UC-65 was credited with sinking 106 ships, either by torpedo or by mines laid.

Design
A German Type UC II submarine, UC-65 had a displacement of  when at the surface and  while submerged. The submarine was powered by two six-cylinder four-stroke diesel engines each producing  (a total of ), two electric motors producing , and two propeller shafts.

UC-65 was fitted with six  mine tubes, eighteen UC 200 mines, three  torpedo tubes (one on the stern and two on the bow), seven torpedoes, and one  Uk L/30 deck gun. Her complement was twenty-six crew members.

Summary of raiding history

References

Notes

References

Bibliography

 
 

Ships built in Hamburg
German Type UC II submarines
U-boats commissioned in 1916
U-boats sunk by British submarines
Maritime incidents in 1917
U-boats sunk in 1917
World War I minelayers of Germany
World War I shipwrecks in the English Channel
World War I submarines of Germany
1916 ships